Namal , is a town and union council, an administrative subdivision, of Mianwali District in the Punjab province of Pakistan. It is part of Mianwali Tehsil and is located at 32°40'10N 71°48'45E.Namal is a combination of  two  Punjabi word "Na" mean No  and "Mul" mean price. So Namal means "The most valuable land" or "The land for which no one can pay the price". In Urdu it means "Anmool"(انمول). This name was given by old residents of here. No doubt this area was "Anmool" as there were 120 wells of drinking water in the valley some hundred years ago.

 This area, known as Namal Valley (وادی نمل) has been very ancient and inhabited for many centuries, which is evidenced by the oldest cemetery of Namal on the banks of the lake and the decayed graves here show how old this area is. There is a well-known tradition that before the British era, the ruler of this area was Raja Sarkap, who was very cruel.

History
The 1915 Gazetteer of Mianwali, in a section entitled "Architectural Objects and Remain-Ruins of Sirkapp Fort", described the Namal area as follows:

References

Union councils of Mianwali District
Populated places in Mianwali District